

General information

Obverse effigy
Unless an obverse design artist is noted, the obverse of all Canadian coins since 2003 features the effigy of Queen Elizabeth II by Susanna Blunt.

Definition of finishes
 Bullion: Brilliant relief against a parallel lined background.
 Proof: Frosted relief against a mirror background
 Specimen: Brilliant relief on a satin background.

Specimen set variants
The Royal Canadian Mint issued two different specimen sets. One set had a variant dollar in its set, while the other set had a variant two dollar coin.

Links to other products and time periods
 Royal Canadian Mint numismatic coins (1900–1999)
 Royal Canadian Mint numismatic coins (2000s)
 Canadian Silver Maple Leaf
 Royal Canadian Mint Olympic coins

Twenty five cents
Among the many commemorative 25 cent coins which didn't have the Queen on the reverse were:

Birds of Canada series (part 2)

Ducks of Canada Series

Prehistoric Creatures (Glow-in-the-Dark) Series

Flora and Fauna Series

Haunted Canada Series

Fifty cents

1/25 ounce gold

One Dollar

Loonie
The Canadian $1 "Loonie" is minted in its regular version, available in the standard Proof, Proof-Like and Special Specimen sets, and it is also minted in various other Commemorative versions (shown below), available in Special Proof-Like sets, and the regular Specimen sets.

Commemorative Silver Dollar Series

Special Edition Proof Dollars

Two Dollars

Toonie
The Canadian $2 "Toonie" is minted in its regular version, available in the standard Proof, Proof-Like and Specimen sets, and it is also minted in a Commemorative version (shown below), available in Special Specimen sets.

Three and Four Dollars
Three Dollars

Four Dollars

Five Dollars

Calendar in the Sky Series

Aboriginal Tradition of Hunting Series

Canadian Banknotes Series

Flowers in Canada (Niobium) Series

Eight Dollars
Eight dollars

Ten Dollars

Ducks of Canada

Dragonfly Series

Canoe Across Canada
This 6-coin set was available in a subscription that included a red wooden canoe-shaped holder.

Adventure Canada

Looney Tunes™
These coins were available as an 8-coin subscription set that included a collector's case

FIFA Women's World Cup Canada™
These coins were available as a 6-coin subscription set that included a collector's case

Other Coins

Fifteen dollars

Exploring Canada

Twenty Dollars

Swarovski Crystals

Maple Canopy Series

Murano Glass Flora and Fauna Series

Group of Seven Series

World Baseball Classic Series

Untamed Canada Series

Butterflies of Canada

Superman Coins

Canadian Dinosaurs

Prehistoric Animals

A Story of the Northern Lights (Silver Hologram) Series

Autumn Painted and Engraved Coins Series

Venetian Glass Holiday Coins

Great Lakes Series

Lost Ships in Canadian Waters
All coins in the series feature edge lettering spelling the name of the vessel.

Grizzly Bear Series

Canadian Homefront Collection

UNESCO: At Home and Abroad Series

First World War Battlefront Series

Second World War Battlefront Series

Looney Tunes™

Majestic Animals

Forests of Canada

Weather Phenomenon Series

Canadian Landscape Series

Wonders of the Universe Series

Pure Silver "$20 for $20" Commemorative Coin Series

A series of commemorative silver coins was introduced in 2011. The coins in this series were sold at their face value of twenty Canadian dollars. They have a specimen finish and are .9999 pure silver, weighing 7.96 grams. The coins were sold by the Mint encapsulated in hard plastic and included a certificate of authenticity. With each release, the Royal Canadian Mint redirected the domain 20for20.ca to the latest coin in the series. In 2012, the third coin in the series became available for order, and a subscription program was introduced allowing customers to purchase the next two coins of the series whose designs had yet to be announced. The first coin of the subscription commemorated the Diamond Jubilee of Elizabeth II and the second commemorated the end of production of the Canadian Penny, both occurring in 2012. Notably, the Diamond Jubilee coin bears a unique reverse design depicting a younger Queen compared to the rest of the coins in the series. A fourth coin was released in 2012 during the holiday season and bore a stylized reindeer on the reverse. The series continued into 2013 with a coin commemorating hockey and another depicting a wolf.

Mint losses on the $20 for $20 program 

The $20 for $20 coin program was launched in 2011 as a "low-risk" way to bring in new collectors of Royal Canadian Mint products. It was initially a success as 4.2 million coins were minted and as the Mint booked profits based on estimated seigniorage ($20 face value less the value of its silver content of 0.256 troy ounce) on coins that won't be redeemed for face value. But as the price of silver has dramatically fallen from 2011 to 2016, massive amounts of the $20 coins were returned, for which the Mint must refund the fixed $20 face value in exchange for a coin whose bullion price has dropped since issue. The refunds intensified further amidst public concerns on these coins' exchangeability for face value.

The Mint was therefore stung with "negative seigniorage" losses reversing seigniorage gains booked when those coins were issued. Employee bonuses were cancelled in 2016, the program was discontinued, and the Mint had to write down the value of $65.5-million worth of Winnipeg plant improvements upon recognizing it cannot realize profits on similar programs into the future. The Mint has declared that there's no plan to place an expiry date on redemptions of these coins.

Twenty Five Dollars

O Canada Series 2013
This series was also available as a subscription and came with a wooden collector's box.

O Canada Series 2014

Glow-in-the-Dark Star Charts Series
Not only did the coins glow-in-the-dark, but so did the outer boxes. When the packaging was placed together, the design formed the pattern of The Big Dipper.

Moon Mask Coins

Other coins

Thirty Dollars

Looney Tunes™ Coins

Fifty Dollars

Pure Silver "$50 for $50" Commemorative Coin series

Five ounce silver

One Hundred Dollars

Wildlife in Motion "$100 for $100" Series

In May 2013 the mint offered the first coin in this series depicting a bison. The coin has a face value of $100 and was sold for $100, analogous to the $20 for $20 series that began in 2011. The coin has a weight of 31.6 g and is 99.99% fine silver, minted with a matte proof finish.

100 Dollar Gold

One Hundred Twenty-Five Dollars

Conservation Collection

Two Hundred Dollars

Landscapes of the North "$200 For $200" Series

200 Dollar Gold

300 Dollar Gold

Coat of Arms series

350 Dollar Gold

Provincial Flowers series

500 Dollar gold

2500 Dollar gold

Chinese Lunar New Year Coin Series

Lotus Series (Sterling silver or Pure silver)
All coins in the Lotus series are scalloped, and were designed by the Three Degrees Creative Group in Vancouver, BC.

Pure silver

18 Karat gold

References

 Charlton Standard Catalogue of Canadian Coins, 60th Edition, 2006, W.K. Cross

External links
 Royal Canadian Mint's Official Website
 Royal Canadian Mint Act
 Canadian Coin Price Guide
 Canadian Numismatic Association
 Numismatic Network Canada
 Canadian Coin News

numismatic, 2010s